Anastasija Sevastova was the defending champion, but lost in the first round to Urszula Radwańska.

Anabel Medina Garrigues won in the final against Kristina Barrois, 6–1, 6–2.

Seeds

Qualifying

Draw

Finals

Top half

Bottom half

References
 Main Draw

Estoril Open - Singles
2011 Women's Singles
Estoril Open